Estebán Blanco Uhlenhaut (born 16 December 1981) is a Costa Rican former swimmer, who specialized in sprint freestyle events. Representing Costa Rica at the 2000 Summer Olympics, he currently holds a national record in the 50 m freestyle that stood for more than a decade.

Blanco competed only in the men's 50 m freestyle at the 2000 Summer Olympics in Sydney. He achieved a FINA B-standard entry time of 23.87 from the Central American and Mexican Championships in his hometown San José. Swimming in heat three, Blanco powered past the entire field to a top seed in a new Costa Rican record of 23.72. Blanco's blistering triumph was not enough to put him through to the semifinals, as he placed forty-fifth overall out of 80 swimmers in the prelims.

References

1981 births
Living people
Olympic swimmers of Costa Rica
Swimmers at the 2000 Summer Olympics
Costa Rican male freestyle swimmers
Sportspeople from San José, Costa Rica
20th-century Costa Rican people
21st-century Costa Rican people